The first season of The Final 1 premiered on MediaCorp Channel 5 on 24 April 2013. It is a Singaporean reality-singing competition programme created by the director of Hype Records Ken Lim. The judges were singer-songwriter Taufik Batisah, singer-actress Kit Chan and Ken Lim. Fly Entertainment artiste Vanessa Vanderstraaten was employed as the host of the show. Class 95FM radio personality Mike Kasem later joined the show as the second host, and hosted the finals together with Vanderstraaten.

The show is also the first in Singapore's history to produce a female winner from an English-based major reality-singing competition programme. The past winners from Singapore Idol, a similar programme which has already ended its run in 2009, were all males.

On 21 August 2013, Farisha Ishak was announced the winner of the first season of The Final 1, beating Shaun Jansen, the recipient of the Wild Card save. She received a $50,000 record deal from Hype Records and a cash prize of $50,000.

Farisha, as the winner, signed to a record label. Ken Lim originally stated he had no plans to sign any of the other finalists from the competition. However, on 23 September, it was announced Hype Records also signed Jansen to its label.

Online auditions
The show is open to all citizens and permanent residents of Singapore aged 16 to 32 as of 1 January 2013. The online auditions began on 11 January 2013 and ended on 15 February 2013. To participate in the auditions, all contestants must register themselves at the official website of the show and submit an audition video of no more than five minutes long. Over 1,000 audition clips were submitted for the competition. Out of all auditionees, 60 were selected by the judges as the top 60 contestants and they were invited to perform in front of them at the top 60 round.

Top 60 round
The top 60 round were held in W Singapore Sentosa Cove where the 60 contestants that were handpicked by the judges from the online auditions competed for a place in the top 40 rounds. Although 60 online auditionees were chosen, only 56 of them turned up for this round of the competition. Hence, four of the top 60 finalists eliminated themselves from the competition prior to the start of the top 60 round. The contestants first emerged on stage in groups but performed individually with a backing track or by playing with a musical instrument. At the end of all performances, 16 contestants who did not impress the judges were eliminated, and the remaining top 40 contestants advanced to the next round.

Top 40 finalists

The following is a list of top 40 finalists who failed to reach the top 20 live rounds:

Top 40 rounds
The top 40 performance rounds started on 1 May and took place at a venue sponsored by The P' Club Group while the results were shown live from MediaCorp TV Theatre. The forty contestants who made it competed in this round and only twenty moved on. The contestants were divided into four groups of ten. Each week, the top 5 vote-getters of the week were revealed during the live results show but it was not a guarantee that they were able to advance to the next round. At the end of all top 40 rounds, all contestants were ranked and the twenty contestants with the most public votes advanced to the next round while the remaining twenty contestants were eliminated. Each group performed in front of the judges and was accompanied by a live band. From this round onwards, the results were solely based on the public votes. The viewers were able to cast their votes via telephone, SMS text voting and the show's Facebook application. Votes cast via the telephone and SMS text voting made up 60% of the total votes, while the remaining 40% was determined by the number of votes received from the show's Facebook application.

Group 1

Best Vocal Performance (Kit Chan's choice): Gail Belmonte, Farisha Ishak & Marc Than
Best Individual Style (Taufik Batisah's choice): Farisha Ishak, Khim Ng & Marc Than
Most Marketability (Ken Lim's choice): None

Group 2

Best Vocal Performance (Kit Chan's choice): Yuresh Balakrishnan, Hydir Idris & Kamsani Jumahat
Best Individual Style (Taufik Batisah's choice): Yuresh Balakrishnan & Alex Hong
Most Marketability (Ken Lim's choice): None

Group 3

Best Individual Style (Taufik Batisah's choice): Glen Wee & Hashy Yusof
Best Vocal Performance (Kit Chan's choice): Glen Wee & Hashy Yusof
Most Marketability (Ken Lim's choice): Glen Wee & Hashy Yusof

Group 4

Best Vocal Performance (Kit Chan's choice): Shaun Jansen, Cheryl K, Louisa Kan & Danial Razak
Best Individual Style (Taufik Batisah's choice): Shaun Jansen & Danial Razak
Most Marketability (Ken Lim's choice): Shaun Jansen

Top 20 finalists

The following is a list of top 20 finalists who failed to reach the finals:

Top 20 live rounds
The top 20 live rounds started on 29 May. The top 20 finalists performed live at the MediaCorp TV Theatre from this round onwards, and the results were also shown live from the same venue. The remaining contestants were once again divided into groups of ten to perform on two separate nights. Similar to the top 40 rounds, each week the weekly top 4 vote-getters were revealed during the live results show but it was not a guarantee that they were able to advance to the next round. At the end of both top 20 live rounds, all contestants were ranked and the eight contestants with the most public votes advanced to the top 10 live rounds. The remaining twelve contestants were put through to the wild card round on 12 June to compete for the final two spots in the top 10. Each group performed live in front of the judges and studio audience, and was accompanied by dancers and stage props.

Group 1

Most Relatability (Taufik Batisah's choice): Yuresh Balakrishnan & Farisha Ishak
Best Stage Presence (Kit Chan's choice): Yuresh Balakrishnan, Farisha Ishak & Meryl Joan Lee
Most Sustainability (Ken Lim's choice): Meryl Joan Lee

Group 2

Best Stage Presence (Kit Chan's choice): Shaun Jansen & Glen Wee
Most Relatability (Taufik Batisah's choice): Shaun Jansen & Glen Wee
Most Sustainability (Ken Lim's choice): Cheryl K & Glen Wee

Wild Card round – Ethnic Songs
Following those eight contestants advancing on 5 June, the remaining twelve top 20 finalists competed in the Wild Card round for the final two spots in the top 10. All contestants performed an ethnic song of their choice. Following another performance by each Wild Card contender, the judges selected two contestants to advance to the final group of 10.

After Yuresh Balakrishnan and Hashy Yusof were selected as the two wild card picks to advance to the top 10, Ken Lim revealed that one of the wild card contestants that was not selected as the wild card pick would be saved from elimination and join the top 10 contestants to form a surprise top 11. In reference to the weekly judges' choices from the past six result shows that highlighted contestants with potential as commercial artists, the choices were converted to points and the non-selected wild card contender with the highest score was saved. Shaun Jansen was announced as the non-selected wild card contender with the highest score and was sent through to the next round as the 11th contestant.

Finalists

The following is a list of top 11 finalists:

Finals
The finals started on 19 June. In this season, there are nine weeks of the finals and 11 finalists, with one finalist eliminated per week based on the Singaporean public's votes (exceptions include top 8-week, where the judges were able to decide who would go home and eliminated three contestants, and the first top 4-week, which was revealed as a surprise non-elimination round). The finalists were housed at W Singapore Sentosa Cove to attend bootcamp sessions. The finals were once again broadcast from MediaCorp TV Theatre in front of a live studio audience, with the exception of the top 2 finale which took place at The Star Theatre. All performances were accompanied by a live band and backing vocalists. Class 95FM radio personality Mike Kasem was named as the second host of the show on the top 11-week.

Top 11 – Their Personal Branding
Mentor: Lionel Roudaut

The top 11 finalists were tasked to work on their personal branding, which could assist them in building fan loyalty and differentiating themselves from the others. Lasalle College of the Arts fashion design programme leader Lionel Roudaut, together with judge Kit Chan were employed as image advisers for the top 11 finalists. The contestants then worked with their respective fashion designers, hairstylists, and beauty consultants to produce their own personal image which was later presented on the show.

 Group performance: "What Makes You Beautiful"
 Best Image (Lionel Roudaut's choice): Glen Wee

Top 10 – Social Media Challenge
Mentor: Khalid Almkhlaafy

The top 10 finalists were put to a "Social Media Challenge" in which they had to come up with creative ideas for an online viral video which reflects their own thoughts and ideals. Lasalle College of the Arts broadcast media programme leader Khalid Almkhlaafy was employed to conduct a guiding workshop for the top 10 finalists. The contestants also worked with the students from Lasalle College of the Arts to conceptualize and produce videos that were based on each of the contestants' original ideas. The videos were then uploaded to the YouTube channel of MediaCorp Channel 5 and the contestants were tasked to promote their own video on social media platforms.

 Group performance: "Get Lucky"
 Most Effective Video (Khalid Almkhlaafy's choice): Shaun Jansen (A Face to the Crowd)
 Most Viewed Video: Shaun Jansen (A Face to the Crowd)

Top 9 – Songs for Their Families & Friends

Each contestant performed a song as a dedication to their families and friends.

 Group performance: "Love Somebody"

Top 8 – Judges' Choice

Each contestant performed a song chosen by the judges.

Prior to the performance show, all contestants attended a mentoring session with their respective judge who chose their song. Similar to the Wild Card round, there was no public voting and the judges decided on the contestants to eliminate from the competition.

 Group performance: "Best Day of My Life"

Top 5 – Songs for Their Fans
Each contestant performed two songs as a dedication to their fans.

 Group performance: "Cups"

Top 4 (first week) – Meet the Press Challenge
Each contestant performed two songs during the performance show. In addition, each contestant was given a question by the judges to assess their ability to respond.

The top 4 finalists were put to a test in media-related situations this week. They attended a photo shoot session with 8 Days magazine, a press conference held at ME@OUE, and a radio talk show, 987 Home with Rozz, hosted by 987FM radio personality Rosalyn Lee. The most media savvy contestant was given the "Eclipse Meet the Press Challenge Award" with $500 worth of prizes.

Judges' questions:
Farisha Ishak: Should you leave the competition tonight, what would you say you can take away from this competition? What have you learnt? – posted by Taufik Batisah
Shaun Jansen: Are you worried that people are harping more on your looks than your talent and what do you intend to do about it? – posted by Kit Chan
Jean Kyaw: Do you think you should be the Final 1 and why? – posted by Ken Lim
Glen Wee: How much do you want to be the Final 1? What are you willing to do to be the winner? – posted by Taufik Batisah
Group performances:
Farisha Ishak, Shaun Jansen, Jean Kyaw & Glen Wee: "Paparazzi"
Jean Kyaw & Glen Wee: "My Boo"
Farisha Ishak & Shaun Jansen: "You and I"
Eclipse Meet the Press Challenge Award: Shaun Jansen – presented by Rosalyn Lee
On the results show, all contestants were declared safe and no one was eliminated. However, Ken Lim stated the elimination was confirmed and the results would be announced the following week.

Top 4 (second week) – Their Original Songs
Mentor: Rai

Each contestant performed two original songs – one that was co-written with songwriters from Ocean Butterflies Music Forest School, and the other that was written entirely by the contestants themselves. All original songs were set to showcase creativity and originality from the contestants. Rai, a singer-songwriter as well as the member of Singaporean duo Jack & Rai, was employed as songwriting advisor for the top 4 finalists.

There was no results show for this week. The contestant who received the fewest votes the previous week was eliminated at the end of the performance show.

It was revealed that Glen Wee received the fewest votes the previous week and was sent home. After the results were announced, Ken Lim explained the rationale of delaying the results for a week as to show the contestants the consequences of missing the opportunity to perform their best. In reference to Glen's elimination, he stated: "I did mention that all of you should treat all your performances as it would be your last. But your previous performances were not good. It's extremely unfortunate that you provided your best performance after opportunities have eluded you."

Top 3 – Reprise Performance
Each contestant reprised one of their previous performances. The rest of the top 11 finalists returned to the show this week to share about their journey throughout the competition.

There was once again no results show for this week. The public voting commenced after the performance show at 9:00pm the previous week. The voting lines and Facebook voting system stayed open till the start of the performance show at 8:00pm this week. The contestant who received the fewest votes from the one-week voting period was eliminated at the end of the performance show. Daily voting updates were published from 2 to 7 August 2013, via the MediaCorp Channel 5's Facebook page. The updates revealed the contestant with the most public votes as of 2:00pm on the particular day.

Group performance: "True Love"

Top 2 – Contestant's Choice / Contestant's Choice / Winner's Single
Each contestant performed two songs of their choice, and their debut single. The debut single, originally written by Ken Lim, was renditioned by Farisha Ishak in its disco version, while Shaun Jansen sang the pop rock version.

Besides voting through phone calls, text messaging, and Facebook, in a first for the entire season of the show, fans were offered the ability to vote for their favourite top 2 finalist through "gift-to-vote" – by purchasing the studio version of the original song performed by the respective top 2 finalists on the second top 4-week. Farisha Ishak's "Life Is Beautiful" and Shaun Jansen's "Here to Stay" are available for download via the MeRadio Store. Each song download was counted as one phone-in vote, which constituted 60% of the overall results. The "gift-to-vote" voting period commenced after the performance show at 9:00pm the previous week and ended at 11:59pm on 20 August 2013. The voting lines and Facebook voting system were made available at 8:30pm, after the first set of performances from the top 2 finalists during the performance show.

Elimination chart

 During the week of 24 July, all contestants were declared safe and there was no eliminated contestant. However, the elimination has been confirmed and the contestant who had the fewest votes this week will be eliminated at the end of the performance show on the week of 31 July.

Results show performances

Contestants who appeared on other shows
Hydir Idris and Kamsani Jumahat originally appeared on Anugerah 2009. Hydir was eliminated in the top 3 boys semi-final round and finished in fifth place overall. Kamsani made it to the top 6 boys quarter-final round but was not offered to participate in the Wild Card round, and therefore finished in eleventh place overall. Kamsani went on to win as Karaoke World Championships Asia male champion in 2014. This is the world's biggest amateur singing competition where the world finals was held in Sweden in 2014.
Khim Ng was a contestant on the first season of Campus SuperStar. She made it to the top 4 girls round and finished in seventh place overall.
Meryl Joan Lee and Charmaine Pelaez originally appeared on the second season of Singapore Idol but was eliminated in the Piano Show round. Meryl was given the opportunity to participate in the Wild Card round, but rejected the offer.
Fathin Amira finished in ninth place on the third season of Singapore Idol.
Farah Erfina and Hashy Yusof auditioned for Anugerah and Singapore Idol respectively, but their placings are unknown.

References

2013 Singaporean television seasons